The Houston Skyline District is a geographic area encompassing several blocks of downtown Houston, Texas, United States.

The term 'Skyline District' originated when downtown Houston was divided into a number of smaller districts: the Main Street Corridor, the Market Square Historical District, and the Houston Theater District.

The collection of skyscrapers in this district creates one of the largest skylines in the United States.  Most of Houston's major modern buildings can be found in this district, including the two tallest buildings in both Houston and Texas:  the JPMorgan Chase Tower (Houston) and Wells Fargo Bank Plaza. These buildings are home to the headquarters of various multinational businesses and financial institutions.

Most of the buildings in the Skyline District are connected by the Houston Downtown Tunnel System.

See also

Downtown Houston
Architecture of Houston

External links
Houston Skyline District map

Geography of Houston
Economy of Houston
Downtown Houston